Café Henry Burger was a restaurant in Gatineau, Quebec, near Ottawa.

The restaurant was opened in 1922 by Swiss immigrant Henry Burger. The business expanded to include a hotel, but the business was forced to close following the 1929 stock market crash. The restaurant reopened on Laval Street and in 1936 Burger died and his wife Marie-Anne Monnin took over the business. After the building was destroyed by a fire in 1942 it moved to its final location at 69 Rue Laurier.

In 1963 Marie Burger was named Restaurateur of the Year. After Burger's death in 1973, the business changed hands a number of times before being acquired by Robert Bourassa in 1982.

The restaurant claimed to have served every prime minister since 1926, and in 2003 was indirectly involved in a public spending scandal regarding bills for meals at the restaurant claimed as expenses by public servants. In 2006 the restaurant closed.

References

Restaurants established in 1922
Restaurants disestablished in 2006
1922 establishments in Quebec
2006 disestablishments in Quebec
Companies based in Gatineau
Restaurants in Ottawa
Defunct restaurants in Canada